MGTK may stand for:
 mGTK, glue code to make GTK+ accessible from Standard ML
 MGTK, the U.S. Environmental Protection Agency's Municipal Government Toolkit, a compilation of fact sheets, case studies, recycling reports, and links to online tools aimed at helping improve community recycling programs
 MGTK, the ICAO code for Mundo Maya International Airport, Guatemala
 MGTK, the stock exchange code for Magnesium Technologies Inc.